Colorado College is a private liberal arts college in Colorado Springs, Colorado. It was founded in 1874 by Thomas Nelson Haskell in his daughter's memory. The college enrolls approximately 2,000 undergraduates at its  campus. The college offers 42 majors and 33 minors. Notable alumni include Liz Cheney, Dutch Clark, Thomas Hornsby Ferril, James Heckman, Steve Sabol, Ken Salazar, and Marc Webb.

Colorado College is affiliated with the Associated Colleges of the Midwest. Most sports teams are in the NCAA Division III, with the exception of Division I teams in men's hockey and women's soccer.

History

Colorado College was founded in 1874 on land designated by U.S. Civil War veteran General William Jackson Palmer, the founder of the Denver and Rio Grande Railroad and of Colorado Springs. Founder Reverend Thomas Nelson Haskell of the Presbyterian Church described it as a coeducational liberal arts college in the tradition of Oberlin College. Like many U.S. colleges and universities that have endured from the 19th century, it now is secular in outlook, and it retains its liberal arts focus.

Cutler Hall, the college's first building, was completed in 1880 and the first degrees were conferred in 1882.

William F. Slocum, president from 1888 to 1917, oversaw the initial building of the campus, expanded the library and recruited top scholars in a number of fields.  In 1930, Shove Chapel was erected by Mr. John Gray, to meet the religious needs of the students (though Colorado College is not religiously affiliated).

Katharine Lee Bates wrote "America the Beautiful" during her summer teaching position at Colorado College in 1893.

Academics

The college offers more than 80 majors, minors, and specialized programs including: Southwest studies, feminist and gender studies, Asian studies, biochemistry, environmental science, neuroscience, Latin American studies, Russian and Eurasian studies, and American cultural studies, as well as an across-the-curriculum writing program. In addition to its undergraduate programs, the college offers a Master of Arts in Teaching (MAT) degree. Tutt Library has approximately half a million bound volumes. In 2012, Colorado College yielded a student-to-faculty ratio of 10:1. Its most popular undergraduate majors, by 2021 graduates, were:
Economics (43)
Political Science & Government (38)
Ecology & Evolutionary Biology (28)
Multi-/Interdisciplinary Studies (25)
Computer & Information Sciences (23)
Psychology (23)
Cell/Cellular & Molecular Biology (22)

Block plan
Colorado College follows a schedule known as the "block plan" in which students study one subject intensively for three-and-a-half-week "blocks", followed by a 4.5-day break. The intensity stems from the time commitment (classes meet for a minimum of three hours Monday through Friday) as well as the demand for engaging rapidly with complex content. Advocates say this allows for more lab time, field research, and an intensive hands-on learning experience with fewer distractions.

Students get a 4.5-day break between blocks.  Most students head off campus, often to participate in some type of outdoor exploration.

Every student begins the Colorado College journey with a "First Year Experience" course, or FYE. This is a back-to-back block spanning 8 weeks and functions as a freshman seminar course.

Students can also take blocks during winter and summer breaks. In January, the college offers "half blocks," an intensive 10-day course fulfilling a half credit. Meanwhile, summer blocks are three weeks long, and there are also graduate blocks of differing lengths. In parallel with the students, professors teach only one block at a time. Classes are generally capped at 25 students to encourage a more personalized academic experience.

Admissions
Colorado College is considered a "most selective school" by U.S. News & World Report. For the class of 2026, Colorado College received a record number of applications, 11,026, and admitted just above eleven percent of those who applied. Those accepted who identified themselves as students of color numbered twenty-five percent. The Class of 2026 is geographically diverse, representing 15 countries and 47 states, with 24 percent who hail from both the Northeast and the West; 17 percent from Colorado; 16 percent from the Midwest; and 15 percent from the South.

Rankings

In its 2021 edition, U.S. News & World Report ranks Colorado College as tied for 25th best liberal arts college in the nation and No. 3 among the most innovative national liberal arts colleges. The most innovative schools are those "making the most innovative improvements in terms of curriculum, faculty, students, campus life, technology or facilities."

Kiplinger's Personal Finance places Colorado College 16th in its 2017 ranking of best value liberal arts colleges in the United States.

In 2019, Forbes rated it 92nd overall in "America's Top Colleges," which ranked 650 national universities, liberal arts colleges and service academies.

CC is one of six colleges in the western US included in the guidebook The Hidden Ivies.

Requirements
Students must satisfactorily complete 32 credits to graduate in addition to specifying a major of study and fulfilling those requirements. The college offers a unique alternative for students who wish to design their own major. However, standardized cross-cutting requirements still apply, though these criteria are fairly broad compared to those at comparable colleges.

Student life
The median family income of Colorado College students is $277,500, the highest of any college or university in the United States, with 54% of students coming from the top 5% highest-earning families and 10.5% from the bottom 60%.

Extracurriculars
The small campus of 2,000 students boasts more than one hundred clubs and student groups, ranging from professional groups, interests clubs, and social groups. Among them are intramural sports groups, which have a strong presence on campus. There are intramural teams, ranging from broomball to ultimate frisbee.

Housing
Most students live on or directly adjacent to the college campus. During the first two years of study, students are required to live on campus in one of the student dorms, while apartments and student-owned housing become available as upperclassmen.

Campus

Many of the earliest campus buildings, including Bemis, Cossitt, Cutler, McGregor, Montgomery, Palmer, and Ticknor Halls, are on the National Register of Historic Places, along with Shove Memorial Chapel and the William I. Spencer Center. Arthur House or Edgeplain, once home to the son of President Chester A. Arthur, is also on the National Register.

Since the mid-1950s, newer facilities include three large residence halls, Worner Campus Center, Olin Hall of Science and the Barnes Science Center, Honnen Ice Rink, Boettcher Health Center, Schlessman Pool, Armstrong Hall of Humanities, and the El Pomar Sports Center.  The face of campus changed again at the beginning of the 21st century with construction of the Western Ridge Housing Complex, which offers apartment-style living for upper-division students and completion of the Russell T. Tutt Science Center. The east campus has been expanded, and is now home to the Greek Quad and several small residence halls known as "theme houses."

Some of the more recent notable buildings include Tutt Library, designed by Skidmore, Owings & Merrill and later expanded and renovated by Pfeiffer Partners to be the largest carbon-neutral academic library in the United States, Packard Hall of Music and Art, designed by Edward Larrabee Barnes, and the Edith Kinney Gaylord Cornerstone Arts Center, which was designed by Antoine Predock with input from faculty and students.

Edith Kinney Gaylord Cornerstone Arts Center
Colorado College's Edith Kinney Gaylord Cornerstone Arts Center, completed in 2008 and located at the intersection of a performing arts corridor in Colorado Springs, is home to the college's film, drama and dance departments and contains a large theater, several smaller performance spaces, a screening room, the I.D.E.A. Space gallery, and classrooms, among other rooms. The building is also LEED certified.

Ed Robson Arena
The Ed Robson Arena is a 3,400-seat ice hockey arena on the campus of Colorado College. The arena opened on September 18 2021. Plans for a school-run arena date as far back as 2008 in the Colorado College Long Range Development Plan. At the time of planning, the Robson arena would be the second smallest facility in the NCHC, ahead of just the Goggin Ice Center. Colorado College justified this decision due to both the small undergraduate size of the college (approximately 2,000) and the average actual attendance of Tiger games (about 2,800). In spite of the COVID-19 pandemic, the arena was opened ahead of schedule in mid-September 2021. It succeeded the Broadmoor World Arena as the home for the Colorado College Tigers ice hockey team and became the first on-campus home for the program after 82 years of operation.

Athletics

The school's sports teams are nicknamed the "Tigers."  Colorado College competes at the NCAA Division III level in all sports except men's hockey, in which it participates in the NCAA Division I National Collegiate Hockey Conference, and women's soccer, where it competes as an NCAA Division I team in the Mountain West Conference. CC dropped its intercollegiate athletic programs in football, softball, and women's water polo following the 2008–09 academic year.

In 1994, a student referendum to change the athletic teams' nicknames to the Cutthroat Trout narrowly failed, by a margin of 468–423.

The Tigers hockey team won the NCAA Division I championship twice (1950, 1957), were runners up three times (1952, 1955, 1996) and have made the NCAA Tournament eighteen times, including eleven times since 1995. In 1996, 1997, and 2005, CC played in the Frozen Four, finishing second in 1996. Fifty-five CC Tigers have been named All-Americans. Hockey Hall of Fame coach Bob Johnson coached the Tigers from 1963 to 1966.

The current hockey coach is Kris Mayotte, who had been an assistant coach at Providence College and the University of Michigan.

KRCC radio
Colorado College operates National Public Radio Member Station KRCC-FM. In 1944, KRCC began as a two-room public address system in the basement of Bemis Hall. Professor Woodson "Chief" Tyree, Director of Radio and Drama Department at Colorado College was the founder and inspirational force in the program that one day became KRCC-FM. In 1946, KRCC moved to South Hall (where Packard Hall now stands) on campus where two students, Charles "Bud" Edmonds '51, and Margaret Merle-Smith '51, were instrumental in securing a war surplus FM transmitter. KRCC began over the air broadcasting in April 1951 as the first non-commercial educational FM radio station in the state of Colorado.

KRCC broadcasts through a series of eleven transmitters and translators throughout southern Colorado and a portion of northern New Mexico.  KRCC's main transmitter, atop Cheyenne Mountain, broadcasts three separate HD multi-cast channels, including a channel run completely by Colorado College students called the SOCC (Sounds of Colorado College).

Notable people

Colorado College has graduated a Nobel Prize winner, a Pulitzer Prize winner, 2 MacArthur Fellows, 14 Rhodes Scholars, 31 Fulbright Scholars, 68 Watson Fellows, and winners of Academy Awards, Emmy Awards, and Grammy Awards. Alumni include Liz Cheney, Peggy Fleming, William A. Welch, and Abdul Aziz Abdul Ghani. Board members include Robert J. Ross, France Winddance Twine, and alumni Frieda Ekotto and Joe Ellis. Life Trustees include David M. Lampton and alumni Neal A. Baer. Honorary Trustees include alumni Lynne Cheney, Diana DeGette, and Ken Salazar. CC has also graduated 18 Olympians and 170 professional hockey players, including over 30 current and former NHL players. Notable faculty and staff include Dick Celeste and Jill Tiefenthaler.

References

Further reading
 Dunn, Joe P., "A Mission on the Frontier: Edward P. Tenney, Colorado College, the New West Education Commission, and the School Movement for Mormons and ‘Mexicans,’" History of Education Quarterly, 52 (Nov. 2012), 535–58.
 Loevy, Robert D. Colorado College: A Place of Learning, 1874–1999. Colorado Springs: Colorado College, 1999.
 Reid, J. Juan. Colorado College: The First Century, 1874–1974. Colorado Springs: Colorado College, 1979.

External links

 
 Colorado College Athletics website
 

 
Liberal arts colleges in Colorado
Private universities and colleges in Colorado
Education in Colorado Springs, Colorado
Schools in Colorado Springs, Colorado
Educational institutions established in 1874
1874 establishments in Colorado Territory
Tourist attractions in Colorado Springs, Colorado
Universities and colleges accredited by the Higher Learning Commission